Viktor Dovgan (born February 27, 1987) is a Russian former professional ice hockey defenceman. He last played with Beibarys Atyrau in the Kazakhstan Hockey Championship (KHC). He was originally selected in the seventh round, 209th overall, by the Washington Capitals in the 2005 NHL Entry Draft.

He formerly played with HC Sarov in the Supreme Hockey League (VHL) under contract from Avtomobilist Yekaterinburg of the Kontinental Hockey League (KHL).

Career statistics

References

External links

1987 births
Living people
Arlan Kokshetau players
Avtomobilist Yekaterinburg players
Beibarys Atyrau players
HC CSKA Moscow players
Hershey Bears players
HC Sarov players
South Carolina Stingrays players
Washington Capitals draft picks
Russian ice hockey defencemen